Oleg Khvatsovas (born September 10, 1967 in Kiev) is a sport shooter who competed for Belarus. He competed at the 2000 Summer Olympics in the men's 25 metre rapid fire pistol event, in which he placed sixth.

References

1967 births
Living people
ISSF pistol shooters
Belarusian male sport shooters
Shooters at the 2000 Summer Olympics
Olympic shooters of Belarus